Neda Moridpour is an artist, educator and organizer who is the co-founder of two artist-activist collaboratives, Louder Than Words (with S.A. Bachman) and [P]Art Collective (with Pouya Afshar.)

Moridpour's work investigates cycles of violence that leads to dislocation, gender and racial inequity while establishing dialogue and attempting to mobilize communities. 

"Louder Than Words" received the 2014 Women's Caucus for Art International Honor Roll award. [P]Art Collective won the 1st prize in the Farhang Foundation Short Film Festival. Her work has been exhibited in the U.S., Iran and China and is in the collection of the Los Angeles County Museum of Art, The Center for the Study of Political Graphics, and was recently exhibited in the Islamic Art Now II: Contemporary Art of the Middle East at the L.A. County Museum of Art (LACMA.)

Moridpour  holds an MFA in Public Practice from Otis College of Art and Design

Career

 Professor of the Practice, Media Arts Department, School of the Museum of Fine Arts at Tufts University, 2018–present
 Visiting Full Time Faculty, Print, Paper and Graphic Arts Department, School of the Museum of Fine Arts at Tufts University 2015-2018
 Part Time Faculty, Department of Art and Design, UMASS Lowell, MA, USA, 2015

References

External links
 Official website - Neda Moridpour

1983 births
Living people
21st-century American women artists
21st-century Iranian women artists
Place of birth missing (living people)
Otis College of Art and Design alumni
Iranian emigrants to the United States
Iranian women activists
American artists of Iranian descent